Curtis Yorke, the pen name of Susan Rowley Richmond Lee (1854 – 1930), was a Scottish writer.

The daughter of John Jex Long, she was born Susan Rowley Long in Scotland and was educated in Glasgow. She married John Wilson Richmond Lee, a mining engineer. The couple moved to Kensington. She published her first novel That Little Girl in 1886 and went on to publish almost 50 titles.

Selected works 
 Hush!: A Novel (1888), 3 volumes, published by Richard Bentley
 Dudley. A Story Of Modern Life (1888) published by Jarrold & Sons
 The Wild Ruthvens: A Home Story (1889) published by Jarrold & Sons
 The Mystery of Belgrave Square (1889) published by F.V. White
 A Romance of Modern London: A Novel (1892), 3 volumes, published by F.V. White
 His Heart to Win (1893) published by Jarrold & Sons
 Between the Silences and Other Stories (1894) published by Jarrold & Sons
 The Medlicotts: An Uneventful Family Chronicle (1895) published by Jarrold & Sons
 Because of the Child: A Story without a Plot (1897) published by Jarrold & Sons
 A Flirtation with Truth (1897) published by John Macqueen
 Carpathia Knox: A Novel (1900) published by Jarrold & Sons
 Only Betty (1907) published by John Long
 All about Judy (1927)

References 

1854 births
1930 deaths
Scottish novelists
Scottish women novelists
Pseudonymous women writers
Pseudonymous writers
19th-century pseudonymous writers
20th-century pseudonymous writers